Jetrin Wattanasin or J Jetrin, is a Thai pop musician and actor who got his first major break in the music business when he secured heavy promotion by the Thai entertainment company, GMM Grammy. Since 1991, he has produced numerous commercially successful music albums, and continues to tour internationally in support of his most recent recordings.  Upon the conclusion of his current United States tour, entitled "The Return of J Jetrin," he will have completed the most extensive tour of the United States by any Thai recording artist, with dates scheduled in 12 US cities, spanning from Hawaii to the East Coast.

Music career
In 1991, Jetrin released his debut solo album Jor-Ae-Bor, emerging from the shadow of his already famous singer brother Jirayuth "Joe" Wattanasin.

After his seventh release 7th Heaven, in November 2007, Jetrin performed over 60 performances around Thailand, concluding with a show entitled "Radioactive the Musical Party by J Jetrin" at the Impact Arena in Bangkok.

Jetrin is currently performing a tour of the United States entitled "The Return of J Jetrin," with dates in Honolulu, Los Angeles, Las Vegas, San Francisco, Fort Worth, Dallas, Washington DC, Atlanta, Boston, New York City, Houston and Chicago. He is performing vocals with the backing of musicians MJ and Bowbo of "3 Kings and the Babe" and DJ 2 Fives.  The tour is being sponsored by Singha Beer.

Acting career
To date, Jetrin has appeared in two feature films. The Pang brothers' Hong Kong/Thai 2006 horror-fantasy film, Re-Cycle, as a secondary character, and Chatchai Naksuriya's Thai coming-of-age 2008 film, Friendship, as an older character who recalls his younger days and his first love.

Personal life

Early years
Born in Bangkok on October 28, 1970, Jetrin is the youngest of three siblings born to a middle-class family. His sister, Jittima Wattanasin, "Jan", was a model in the Thai fashion industry. Whereas, his brother Jirayuth Wattanasin, "Joe", was one of the lead singers of "Nuvo" – one of GMM Grammy's first and most famous boy-bands. He (who)? got a bachelor from Bangkok University and University of California.

Recent Times
On January 27, 2001, Jetrin married Thai actress, Kejmanee Pichaironnarongsongkhram, and they had three children named Jinjet (Jaonaay) (1st son), Jakkapat (Jaokhun) (2nd son) and Jak (Jaosamut) (3rd son), but he has other one daughter with Gina Li (Jidapa Na Lamliang), named Jayda Na Lamliang.

Discography
1991 : Jor-Ae-Bor (being the spelling of the word chep (เจ็บ), meaning "pain")
1993 : 108-1009
1995 : Choola Choola
1998 : J-Day
2000 : J-Fight
2003 : Ta Lok Nee Mai Mee Puu Ying ("If This World Had No Women")
2008 : 7th Heaven
2009 : Joe + J Jetrin – The Brothers Album

Filmography

Acting 
Re-cycle (2006)
 Friendship: Theu kap chan (2008)

Dubbing 

 Kamen Rider Blade: Missing Ace (2004) as Sakuya Tachibana/Kamen Rider Garren and Covered "Someday Somewhere" in Thai version that was insert song for dubbed version of Kamen Rider Blade: Missing Ace.

Television

TV Program 

HBD 
Club no.5 Sport
5 Maha Ruai
Chap Phae Chon Kae 
J Entertainment
5 4 3 2 Show Smile Land
7 Si Concert
Saturday Show
Sport fan
J minute
J variety
Super Gag 
Khun Likhit 
Mo Chit Tit Cho
World cup mania
The One
GT ACADEMY THAILAND 2016
The Next Boy/Girl Band Thailand 2018

Endorsements

 Brand's  
 Malee 
 Mitsubishi 
 Sunsilk 
 Dulux Easy Care
 VOICE TO THAI i-mobile
 Samsung Life Insurance
 Pepsi & Lay's 
 Vitamilk
 M-PressoDouble Shot

References

External links 

 

1970 births
Living people
Jetrin Wattanasin
Jetrin Wattanasin
Jetrin Wattanasin
Jetrin Wattanasin
Jetrin Wattanasin
Jetrin Wattanasin
Jetrin Wattanasin
Jetrin Wattanasin
Jetrin Wattanasin
Jetrin Wattanasin
Jetrin Wattanasin
Jetrin Wattanasin